The Billboard Latin Music Award for Songwriter of the Year is an honor presented annually at the Billboard Latin Music Awards, a ceremony which honors "the most popular albums, songs, and performers in Latin music, as determined by the actual sales, radio airplay, streaming and social data that informs Billboards weekly charts." The award is given to the best performing songwriters on Billboards Latin charts.

Marco Antonio Solís is the most awarded songwriter in the category with five wins out of ten nominations, followed by Espinoza Paz and Romeo Santos with four awards each from six and seven nominations, respectively. As of 2017, only Marco Antonio Solís, Espinoza Paz and Romeo Santos have won Songwriter of the Year thrice in a row. The current holder as of the 2019 ceremony is Juan "Gaby Music" Rivera.

Recipients

Records

Most nominations

Most awards

References

Awards established in 1996
Billboard Latin Music Awards